The Lamprophiidae are a family of snakes found throughout much of Africa, including the Seychelles. There are 89 species as of July 2022.

Biology
Lamprophiids are a very diverse group of snakes. Many are terrestrial but some are fossorial (e.g. Amblyodipsas) or semi-aquatic (e.g. Lycodonomorphus). Some are fast-moving (e.g. Psammophis) whereas others are slow (e.g. Duberria). They are found in deserts, grasslands,  tropical forests and mountains. Together they feed on mammals, birds, reptiles, amphibians, fish, and invertebrates. Some species use constriction to subdue their prey (e.g. Boaedon). When other snake families were formerly included within the Lamprophiidae, they were considered even more diverse in biology, although this is now known to not be the case. Most species are oviparous.

Classification
Most lamprophiids were historically considered to be members of the subfamily Lamprophiinae in the family Colubridae. The following classification follows Pyron et al., 2010, whose finding that lamprophiids are more closely related to elapids has been repeated by several other studies. Together these two groups are sometimes referred to as the Elapoidea. In fact, some studies have found that Elapidae is nested within Lamprophiidae, a finding that necessitated taxonomic changes to restore monophyly within the Elapoidea. Following this, multiple subfamilies within Lamprophiidae were reclassified as their own families, reducing the number of species, overall distribution, and diversity in form of Lamprophiidae as previously defined; prior to this revision, members of Lamprophiidae were thought to be even more diverse in form and behavior, and were thought to have a distribution from Africa to Madagascar, southern Europe, and most of Asia. They are now known to be found in only Africa.

List of subfamilies and genera

 Lamprophiidae
 Alopecion Duméril, 1853 - spotted house snake
 Boaedon A.M.C. Duméril, Bibron & A.H.A. Duméril, 1854
 Bofa Tiutenko, Koch, Pabijan, & Zinenko, 2022- Ethiopian house snake
 Bothrolycus Günther, 1874
 Bothrophthalmus W. Peters, 1863
 Chamaelycus Boulenger, 1919
 Dendrolycus Laurent, 1956
 Gonionotophis Boulenger, 1893
 Gracililima Broadley, Tolley, Conradie, Wishart, Trape, Burger, Kusamba, Zassi-Boulou & Greenbaum, 2018 
 Hormonotus Hallowell, 1857
 Inyoka Kelly, Branch, Broadley, Barker & Villet, 2011
 Lamprophis Fitzinger, 1843
 Limaformosa Broadley, Tolley, Conradie, Wishart, Trape, Burger, Kusamba, Zassi-Boulou, & Greenbaum, 2018
 Lycodonomorphus Fitzinger, 1843
 Lycophidion Fitzinger, 1843
 Mehelya Csíki, 1903
 Montaspis Bourquin, 1991
 Pseudoboodon Peracca, 1897

Former subfamilies 
These taxa were formerly classified in the Lamprophiidae, but are now either classified as families of their own or subfamilies in other taxa.

 Subfamily Atractaspidinae (now Atractaspididae)
 Subfamily Cyclocorinae (now Cyclocoridae)
 Subfamily Prosymninae (now Prosymnidae)
 Subfamily Psammophiinae (now Psammophiidae)
 Subfamily Pseudaspidinae (now Pseudaspididae)
 Subfamily Pseudoxyrhophiinae (now Pseudoxyrhophiidae)
 Genus Buhoma (now incertae sedis within Elapoidea)

In captivity 
Some members of the Lamprophiidae, such as the African house snake (genus Boaedon) are kept and bred as pets by herpetoculturists worldwide. Due to their placid nature, classification as nonvenomous snakes, easy care requirements and small size, many of the species that are bred in captivity are considered by many to be a perfect pet reptile for novices and experienced reptile keepers alike.

References

Further reading
Fitzinger L. 1843. Systema Reptilium, Fasciculus Primus, Amblyglossae. Vienna: Braumüller & Seidel. 106 pp. + indices..

External links

 

 
Reptile families
Taxa named by Leopold Fitzinger